David "Dai" Rees Prosser (13 October 1912 – 6 May 1973) was a Welsh dual-code international rugby union, and professional rugby league footballer who played in the 1930s and 1940s, and coached rugby league in the 1960s.

Background
Dai Prosser was born in Neath, Wales, he was a Bombardier in the British Army during World War II, and he died aged 60 in York, Yorkshire.

Playing career

International honours
Dai Prosser won 8 caps for Wales (RU) in 1936–1944 while at Glynneath RFC in 1934 against Scotland, and Ireland, won caps for Wales (RL) while at York, and Leeds, and won a cap for Great Britain (RL) while at Leeds in 1937 against Australia at Fartown Ground, Huddersfield.

Championship final appearances
Dai Prosser played right-, i.e. number 10, in Leeds' 2–8 defeat by Hunslet in the Championship Final during the 1937–38 season at Elland Road, Leeds on Saturday 30 April 1938.

Challenge Cup Final appearances
Dai Prosser played left-, i.e. number 8, in Leeds' 19–2 victory over Halifax in the 1940–41 Challenge Cup Final during the 1940–41 season at Odsal Stadium, Bradford, in front of a crowd of 28,500, played left- in the 15–10 victory over Halifax in the 1941–42 Challenge Cup Final during the 1941–42 season at Odsal Stadium, Bradford, in front of a crowd of 15,250, he missed the 15-16 aggregate defeat by Dewsbury in the two-legged 1942–43 Challenge Cup Final during the 1942–43 season at Crown Flatt, Dewsbury and Headingley Rugby Stadium, Leeds, and played left- in the 8–4 defeat by Bradford Northern in the 1947 Challenge Cup Final during the 1946–47 season at Wembley Stadium, London on Saturday 3 May 1947, in front of a crowd of 77,605.

During Dai Prosser's time at Leeds, they appeared in four Challenge Cup Finals winning two (1941 and 1942), and losing two (1943 and 1947), he appeared in three of these Challenge Cup Finals, and was on the winning side twice.

County Cup Final appearances
Dai Prosser played right-, i.e. number 10, in York's 9–2 victory over Wakefield Trinity in the 1936 Yorkshire County Cup Final during the 1936–37 season at Headingley Rugby Stadium, Leeds on Saturday 17 October 1936, and played right- in Leeds' 14–8 victory over Huddersfield in the 1937–38 Yorkshire County Cup Final during the 1937–38 season at Belle Vue, Wakefield on Saturday 30 October 1937.

Testimonial match
Dai Prosser's shared Testimonial match with David "Dai" Jenkins, Jr. at Leeds took place in 1949.

Other notable matches
Dai Prosser played left- for Northern Command XIII against a Rugby League XIII at Thrum Hall, Halifax on Saturday 21 March 1942.

Club career
Dai Prosser made his début for Leeds against Dewsbury in the Championship during the 1936–37 season on Saturday 14 November 1936, and he scored his first try for Leeds against Huddersfield during the 1937–38 season.

Coaching career
Dai Prosser was the assistant-coach to Joe Warham in Leeds' 25–10 victory over Warrington in the Championship Final during the 1960–61 season at Odsal Stadium, Bradford on Saturday 20 May 1961, in front of a crowd of 52,177.

Family
Dai Prosser was the younger brother of the rugby union, and rugby league footballer; Glyn Prosser.

References

External links
!Great Britain Statistics at englandrl.co.uk (statistics currently missing due to not having appeared for both Great Britain, and England)
Team – Past Players – O - P at swansearfc.co.uk
Profile at swansearfc.co.uk

1912 births
1973 deaths
Army XIII rugby league players
British Army personnel of World War II
British Army soldiers
Dual-code rugby internationals
Glamorgan County RFC players
Glynneath RFC players
Great Britain national rugby league team players
Leeds Rhinos coaches
Leeds Rhinos players
Neath RFC players
Northern Command XIII rugby league team players
Rugby league players from Neath
Rugby league props
Rugby union players from Neath
Rugby union props
Swansea RFC players
Wales international rugby union players
Wales national rugby league team players
Welsh rugby league coaches
Welsh rugby league players
Welsh rugby union players
York Wasps players